Jermaine Grace (born November 8, 1993) is an American football linebacker for the Montreal Alouettes of the Canadian Football League (CFL). He played college football at the University of Miami.

High school
Grace attended Miramar High School in Miramar
, Florida. He was rated four-stars by ESPNU, 247Sports and Rivals, and was ranked as the 11th best linebacker nationally by ESPN.

College career
Grace committed to Miami over Tennessee and Louisville. Most of Grace’s contributions during his freshman year came from playing on special teams. In 2015 he led the team with 79 tackles and 6 tackles for loss. Grace along with teammate Al-Quadin Muhammad became entangled in a luxury rental car scandal that resulted in them being dismissed from the school, since it was a violation of NCAA rules.

Professional career

Atlanta Falcons
Grace signed with the Atlanta Falcons as an undrafted free agent on April 29, 2017. He made the Falcons' final roster, playing in five games before being waived on November 14, 2017.

Indianapolis Colts
On November 15, 2017, Grace was claimed off waivers by the Indianapolis Colts. He was waived by the Colts on May 1, 2018.

Cleveland Browns
After being waived by the Colts, Grace was claimed off waivers by the Cleveland Browns on May 2, 2018. He was waived on September 2, 2018.

Seattle Seahawks
On September 3, 2018, Grace was claimed off waivers by the Seattle Seahawks. He was waived/injured on September 14, 2018 and was placed on injured reserve. He was released on October 15. 2018.

Atlanta Falcons (second stint)
On October 18, 2018, Grace was signed to the Atlanta Falcons practice squad. He signed a reserve/future contract with the Falcons on December 31, 2018.

On November 29, 2019, Grace was waived by the Falcons.

Seattle Seahawks (second stint)
On December 5, 2019, Grace was signed to the Seattle Seahawks practice squad. He was released by the Seahawks on December 17, 2019.

Cleveland Browns (second stint)
Grace was signed to the Cleveland Browns' practice squad on December 19, 2019. The Browns signed Grace to their reserve/futures list on December 30, 2019. He was waived on July 31, 2020.

New York Giants
On September 22, 2020, Grace was signed to the New York Giants practice squad, but was released two days later.

Montreal Alouettes
Grace signed with the Montreal Alouettes of the CFL on June 9, 2021.

References

External links
Atlanta Falcons bio

1993 births
Living people
American football linebackers
Atlanta Falcons players
Cleveland Browns players
Indianapolis Colts players
Miami Hurricanes football players
Montreal Alouettes players
New York Giants players
Players of American football from Florida
Seattle Seahawks players
Sportspeople from Hollywood, Florida
Miramar High School alumni